The 2015 Marion Blue Racers season was the fifth season for the indoor football franchise, and their first in the X-League Indoor Football.

On October 22, 2014, the Blue Racers announced that former Kentucky Drillers owner and coach, Rick Kranz would be the team's head coach for the 2015 season.

After a 2–2 start to the season, Owner LaMonte Coleman fired Kranz, and named himself the teams interim head coach.

The Racers finished the season 5–3, but in a 4-way tie for 3rd place, causing the Blue Racers to miss the playoffs.

Schedule
Key:

Regular season
All start times are local to home team

Standings

 z-Indicates best regular season record
 x-Indicates clinched playoff berth

Roster

References

Marion Blue Racers
Marion Blue Racers
Marion Blue Racers